Mohammad Mehdi Tehranchi (Persian: محمد مهدی طهرانچی, born  1965 in Tehran, Iran) is an Iranian theoretical physicist, professor at laser and plasma research institute and department of physics of Shahid Beheshti University and member of board of trustees and president of the Islamic Azad University. He was former rector of the Islamic Azad University Central Tehran Branch and Islamic Azad University of Tehran Province and Shahid Beheshti University

References

1954 births
Living people
Academic staff of Shahid Beheshti University
People from Tehran
Academic staff of the Islamic Azad University